Hamzah Idris Falatah (born 8 October 1972) is a Saudi Arabian footballer. He played as a striker for Ohud from 1992 to 1995 and then for Al Ittihad until he retired in 2007.

For Saudi Arabia national team he participated at the 1994 FIFA World Cup, 1996 Summer Olympics and at 1999 FIFA Confederations Cup.

He held the national record for most goals scored in one season at 33 goals for the 1999–2000 season. This record was superseded in 2018–2019 season, when Abderrazak Hamdallah scored 34 goals .

He is currently an assistant coach for Al-Ittihad, He was number 9 for Al-Ittihad.

Club Carrer Stats

References

External links

1972 births
Living people
People from Medina
Saudi Arabian footballers
Saudi Arabia international footballers
Ittihad FC players
Ohod Club players
1992 King Fahd Cup players
1992 AFC Asian Cup players
1994 FIFA World Cup players
Olympic footballers of Saudi Arabia
Footballers at the 1996 Summer Olympics
1999 FIFA Confederations Cup players
2000 AFC Asian Cup players
AFC Asian Cup-winning players
Footballers at the 1990 Asian Games
Association football forwards
Saudi First Division League players
Saudi Professional League players
Asian Games competitors for Saudi Arabia
20th-century Saudi Arabian people